Terah Panne is an Indian TV series directed by Vikas Desai in 1985. It was produced by Vikas Desai and Kiran Shantaram. The main cast of the program are Hema Malini and Tarun Dhanrajgir. Hema Malini played the role of queen "Padmavati".

Cast
Hema Malini 
Tarun Dhanrajgir
Ravindra Mankani

References

External links 
 

Indian television series